Epilobium lactiflorum is a species of willowherb known by the common name milkflower willowherb or whiteflower willowherb. This plant is found throughout northern North America and northern Eurasia, where it most often grows in moist, rocky areas at some elevation. It is a hairy, clumping perennial with thin stems reaching 10 to 50 centimeters in height, and leafy stolons. The leaves are 2 to 5 centimeters long and have hairs along the edges and winged petioles. The tiny flowers are usually white, sometimes pink, and have notched petals 3 to 6 millimeters long. The fruit is a hairy capsule up to 10 centimeters in length.

External links

Jepson Manual Treatment
Photo gallery

lactiflorum